KNFL (1470 AM) was an Adult Standards formatted radio station licensed to Tremonton, Utah. The station was originally simulcast with sister station KOGN however then began running its own network.

History
The station was constructed by AM Radio 1470, Inc. a subsidiary of Legacy Communications Corpotation and was authorized to commence construction on November 15, 2001, with the temporary call sign KACE. The KACE calls were used while the station was under construction. According to the FCC records of the station, the station became KNFL on September 9, 2004. The station signed on  January 27, 2006, simulcasting its sister station in Ogden, Utah: KOGN. The station went silent on April 1, 2006, and remained off the air for several months.

On May 29, 2009, The Fifth District Court of Utah in Washington County, Utah appointed a receiver to take over KNFL for US Capital, Incorporated of Boulder, Colorado, an investment group which foreclosed on Legecy Media, the owners of KNFL and several other stations. The receiver turned the license in to the FCC on November 13, 2012, and requested it be cancelled pursuant to court approval. The FCC cancelled the license on November 19, 2012.

As of October 1, 2013, KNFL was transferred to the former KINF in Nampa, Idaho.

References

External links

NFL
Radio stations established in 2001
Classical music radio stations in the United States
Box Elder County, Utah
2001 establishments in Utah
Radio stations disestablished in 2012
Defunct radio stations in the United States
2012 disestablishments in Utah
NFL